Eolinguipolygnathus is an extinct genus of conodont from the Early Devonian (Emsian).

References

External links 

Conodont genera
Devonian conodonts